The 1968 Utah gubernatorial election was held on November 5, 1968. Democratic incumbent Cal Rampton defeated Republican nominee Carl W. Buehner with 68.71% of the vote.

General election

Candidates
Cal Rampton, Democratic
Carl W. Buehner, Republican

Results

References

1968
Utah
Gubernatorial
November 1968 events in the United States